The 2013–14 Eastern Kentucky Colonels basketball team represented Eastern Kentucky University during the 2013–14 NCAA Division I men's basketball season. The Colonels, led by ninth year head coach Jeff Neubauer, played their home games at McBrayer Arena within Alumni Coliseum and were members of the East Division of the Ohio Valley Conference. They finished the season 24–10, 11–5 in OVC play to finish in second place in the East Division. They were champions of the OVC tournament to earn an automatic bid to the NCAA tournament where they lost in the second round to Kansas.

Roster

Schedule

|-
!colspan=9 style="background:#7A0019; color:#FFFFFF;"| Regular season

|-
!colspan=9 style="background:#7A0019; color:#FFFFFF;"| Ohio Valley Conference tournament

|-
!colspan=9 style="background:#7A0019; color:#FFFFFF;"| NCAA tournament

References

Eastern Kentucky Colonels men's basketball seasons
Eastern Kentucky
Eastern Kentucky